Emil Lockwood (September 23, 1919 – August 2, 2002) was an American businessman and politician who represented Gratiot County in the Michigan Senate from 1963 to 1970, serving as the Senate Minority Leader from 1965 to 1966 and Senate Majority Leader from 1967 to 1970. As a young man, Lockwood served in the Pacific Theater in World War II, aboard a Landing Ship Tank.

Early life and education
Lockwood was born in Ottawa, Illinois, and was a descendant of Franz Karl Achard on his mother's side. His namesake, Emil Achard, founded Saginaw Plate Glass Company in Saginaw, Michigan, where his family eventually moved. Lockwood earned an associate's degree from Kemper Military School in Boonville, Missouri, followed by a Bachelor of Arts degree and Master of Business Administration from the University of Michigan. He served with distinction aboard an LST in the Pacific Theater of World War II.

Career
After leaving the United States Navy, Lockwood taught amphibious warfare at Westminster College and accounting at Albion College. He then left academics and established a private accounting practice.

Lockwood began his career as a member of the Alma, Michigan Board of Education. He later served as a member of the Gratiot County, Michigan Board of Supervisors and was the president of the St. Louis, Michigan Rotary Club. Lockwood worked as a campaign manager for Detroit mayor Albert Cobo and Congressman R. James Harvey.

In 1963, Lockwood was elected to the Michigan Senate, representing Gratiot County, Clinton County, Shiawassee County, and portions of Montcalm County and Eaton County. He was re-elected in 1965 and selected to serve as Senate Minority Leader by members of the Michigan Senate Republican Caucus. He was re-elected again in 1967 and selected to serve as Senate Majority Leader after Republicans won the majority of senate seats.

Lockwood left the Michigan Senate in 1970 to launch an unsuccessful bid for Michigan Secretary of State. With F.J. Coomes in 1971, he co-founded Public Affairs Associates, the state's first multi-client bipartisan lobbying firm. Lockwood was later appointed chief lobbyist and deputy director of the Michigan Department of Commerce under Governor William Milliken.

Personal life 
In his later life, Lockwood retired to Duck Key, Florida. He died in Ann Arbor, Michigan in 2002.

Bibliography
Man in Motion: Michigan's Legendary Senate Majority Leader, Emil Lockwood, by Stanley C. Fedewa and Marilyn H. Fedewa, Llumina, 2003, distributed by Michigan State University Press.
The Political Graveyard by Lawrence Kestenbaum.

References

1919 births
2002 deaths
Military personnel from Michigan
Republican Party Michigan state senators
People from Gratiot County, Michigan
United States Navy personnel of World War II
People from Ottawa, Illinois
Ross School of Business alumni
County commissioners in Michigan
School board members in Michigan
20th-century American politicians
Albion College faculty